Alexandre Jardin (born 14 April 1965) is a French writer, film director and winner of the Prix Femina, 1988, for Le Zèbre.

Filmography
 1992 : Le Zèbre - Writer (novel) 
 1993 : Fanfan - Director, Writer 
 1996 : Oui - Director, Writer & Actor

References

People from Neuilly-sur-Seine
Living people
20th-century French novelists
21st-century French novelists
Prix du premier roman winners
Prix Femina winners
1965 births
French male novelists
Sciences Po alumni
20th-century French male writers
21st-century French male writers